is a former Japanese football player, who last featured for Azul Claro Numazu.

Playing career
Yuta Kutsukake played for J3 League club; Fujieda MYFC from 2014 to 2015. In 2016, he moved to Azul Claro Numazu. He opted to retire in January 2019.

Club statistics
Updated to 23 February 2019.

References

External links

Profile at Azul Claro Numazu 

1991 births
Living people
Kwansei Gakuin University alumni
Association football people from Tokyo
Japanese footballers
J3 League players
Japan Football League players
Fujieda MYFC players
Azul Claro Numazu players
Association football midfielders